Pascoea idae is a species of beetle in the family Cerambycidae. It was described by White in 1855. It is known from Moluccas.

References

Tmesisternini
Beetles described in 1855